Futbolo klubas Babrungas, commonly known as Babrungas, is a Lithuanian football club located in Plungė, in Plungė District. They currently play in the I Lyga, the second tier of Lithuanian football.

History
The club was created in 1935. During the Soviet occupation in Lithuania, the club was in the top division for a long time. 

In 1956, the team from the small town of Plungė became champions of Lithuania.

Currently, they play in the I Lyga.

Name
Babrungas is a river in Plungė District.

First time the club was renamed Babrungas in 1942. Last time was in 1994.

Historical names 
 1942—1947:	Babrungas
 1948—1955:	Spartakas
 1956—1972:	Linų audiniai
 1973—1989:	Kooperatininkas
 1990—1993:	Robotas
 1994— now:    Babrungas

Honours
 The club's honours in soviet occupation period (Played in "A" klasė (top division) or "B" klasė (second tier).
 In 1956, they became champions of Lithuania.

Domestic

 Soviet Lithuania A klasė: 1 
 Champions: 1956

  Pirma lyga (D2)
 Runners-up: 1990

  II lyga, Western Zone (D3)
 Champions: 1996/97 Trečia lyga (D3)*
 Runners-up: 2018 II Lyga Western Zone (D3)*

Recent seasons team play in II lyga Western Zone championship.

A klasė seasons

Recent seasons

Kit evoliution

Colors 
 ???? – 2015

 2016 –

Stadium
Club play their home matches in Plungė Stadium. The current capacity of the stadium is 500 seats.

Coaching
  Jeremiah "Rudy" Roediger, 2017

Current squad 
 

|-----
! colspan="9" bgcolor="#B0D3FB" align="left" |
|----- bgcolor="#DFEDFD"

|-----
! colspan="9" bgcolor="#B0D3FB" align="left" |
|----- bgcolor="#DFEDFD"

|-----
! colspan="9" bgcolor="#B0D3FB" align="left" |
|----- bgcolor="#DFEDFD"

References

External links
  
 lietuvosfutbolas.lt 
 Statistics & Info

Football clubs in Lithuania
Association football clubs established in 1935